Amel Mokhtar (born February 4, 1964) is a Tunisian journalist and novelist. She has won several prizes, including the COMAR Special Prize in 2006 for her novel Māystrū (Maestro).

Biography
Mokhtar was born in the town of Maktar in the Siliana Governorate, Tunisia. She completed a bachelor's degree in Natural Science at the University of Tunis and began a career in journalism in 1985.   

Mokhtar published many short stories in Tunisian newspapers and Arab literary magazines. She published her first novel, Nakhab al-hāyat, in 1993 with Dar al-Adab in Beirut; she was the first Tunisian woman to publish with this prestigious press. She then published a short story collection entitled La taʿshiqī hādha al-rajul and her novel al-Kursī al-hazzāz in 2003. She has won several prizes such as the Tunisian ministry of culture's prize for literary innovation in 1994 and the COMAR Special Prize (for "remarkable originality in a novel") for her novel Māystrū in 2006.

Works

Novels 

 (1993) Nakhab al-hāyat ( (Toasts to life))
 (2003) al-Kursī al-hazzāz ( (The rocking chair))
 (2007) Māystrū ( (Maestro))
 (2013) Dukhan al-qasr ( (Smoke of the palace))

Short story collections 

 (2003) La taʿshiqī hādha al-rajul ( (Don't love this man))
 (2004) li-al-Mārid wajha jamīl ( (The monster has a pretty face))
 (2015) Ḥafal al-ʾashbāḥ ( (Party of ghosts))

Awards and honours 

 (1988) Taher Hedad prize for short stories
 (1994) Ministry of Culture prize for creative literature (for her novel Toast to Life)
 (2006) COMAR  Special Prize for Tunisian Novel (for Maestro)
 (2015) CTAM'ART Prize (2nd Place) for Culture and Creativity (for Party of ghosts)

References 

Living people
1964 births
20th-century Tunisian women writers
20th-century Tunisian writers
21st-century Tunisian writers
21st-century Tunisian women writers
Tunisian novelists
Tunisian journalists
People from Siliana Governorate